Célestin Oliver (12 July 1930 – 5 June 2011) was a French footballer who played as a striker. He was part of the France national team during the 1952 Summer Olympics and the 1958 FIFA World Cup tournaments. 

In 1979, he created an education academy in Marseille, where he would train Christophe Galtier, Eric Cantona, Benjamin Gavanon, and Cédric Carrasso.

Honours
Sedan
Coupe de France: 1955–56

France
 FIFA World Cup: third place 1958

References

External links
 
 
 
 Player profile at the French Football Federation's official web site 
 Stats

1930 births
2011 deaths
French footballers
France international footballers
Association football forwards
Olympic footballers of France
Footballers at the 1952 Summer Olympics
1958 FIFA World Cup players
CS Sedan Ardennes players
Angers SCO players
Olympique de Marseille players
SC Toulon players
Ligue 1 players
French football managers
Stade Malherbe Caen managers
Stade de Reims managers
US Boulogne managers
SC Toulon managers
People from Mostaganem
Pieds-Noirs